"Gå & fiska!" ("Go and/to fish") is a song written by Per Gessle, and recorded by Gyllene Tider for their Gyllene Tider EP, as well as their Återtåget '96 tour. The song appeared at the re-release of the Gyllene Tider compilation album Halmstads pärlor.

The song was awarded given a Grammis award for "Song of the year 1996" and the song also won a Rockbjörnen award in the "Swedish song of the year 1996" category.

Scoring a Svensktoppen hit for seven weeks between 20 July and 31 August 1996, it peaked at number five on the chart. The song also charted at Trackslistan.

Lyrical, the song asks for relaxing with leisure activities, like fishing, to escape stress, today (1996) as well as back in the 17th century.

Other version
The "Väder-Annika" ("Weather-Annika") character from the Rally radio program performed the song in August 1996 as "Slå och smiska" ("Hit and spank"), using the stage name "Läder-Annika" ("Leather-Annika") causing controversies in newspapers.

At Smurfhits 4 in 1998, a version of song called "Gå och smurfa" ("Walk and smurf") was recorded.

References

1996 songs
Gyllene Tider songs
Songs written by Per Gessle
Swedish-language songs